British Mauritius competed at the 1962 British Empire and Commonwealth Games in Perth, Western Australia, from 22 November to 1 December 1962.

Athletics

Men
Track events

References

1962
Nations at the 1962 British Empire and Commonwealth Games
British Empire and Commonwealth Games